Pranav Misshra is an International film actor and writer.  He has appeared as Prem Singh Rathod in Aisi Deewangi Dekhi Nahi Kahin show on Zee TV. He is also known for roles in Kya Huaa Tera Vaada as Ajay Gujral opposite Sargun Mehta, MTV Timeout With Imam (2013), Jodha Akbar as Mirza Hakim( Akbar's Younger Brother ) {2013-15}  Colors Nagin Season 1(2015) as Arjun, MTV Girls on Top as Shekhar, Kasam Tere Pyaar Ki as Nakul Singh Bedi, Albeli Kahani Pyar ki as Geet Gandhi   Mishra started his career by doing varied roles in various television shows. He is shown in Colors TV's Internet Wala Love as Karan. He has successfully anchored shows, concerts. He is currently playing the role of Akki, who is the parallel lead character in the show Bade Acche Lagte Hai 2 on Sony TV.

Television

References

External links 
 

Living people
Place of birth missing (living people)
Indian male soap opera actors
Year of birth missing (living people)